Omari Abdallah (born 5 May 1943) is a Tanzanian long-distance runner. He competed in the marathon at the 1964 Summer Olympics and in the 4 x 400 metres relay at the 1972 Summer Olympics.

References

External links
 

1943 births
Living people
Athletes (track and field) at the 1964 Summer Olympics
Athletes (track and field) at the 1972 Summer Olympics
Tanzanian male long-distance runners
Tanzanian male marathon runners
Olympic athletes of Tanganyika
Olympic athletes of Tanzania
Athletes (track and field) at the 1966 British Empire and Commonwealth Games
Athletes (track and field) at the 1974 British Commonwealth Games
Commonwealth Games competitors for Tanzania
Place of birth missing (living people)